The Trustworthy Software Foundation (TSFdn) is a UK not-for-profit organisation, with stated aim of improving software.

History
TSFdn evolved from a number of previous activities:
A study by the Cabinet Office, Central Sponsor for Information Assurance (CSIA) in 2004-5 which identified a pervasive lack of secure software development practices as a matter for concern
A Department of Trade and Industry (DTI – predecessor of BIS) Global Watch Report in 2006 which noted a relative lack of secure software development practices in the UK
The Technology Strategy Board (TSB) Cyber Security Knowledge Transfer Network (CSKTN) Special Interest Group (SIG) on Secure Software Development (SSD, 2007-8)
The TSB / Foreign and Commonwealth Office (FCO) Science and Innovation Network (SIN) Multinational Workshop “Challenges to building in … information security, privacy and assurance”, held in Paris in March 2009
The Secure Software Development Partnership (SSDP) Study Period, funded jointly by the UK government' TSB and the Centre for the Protection of National Infrastructure (CPNI) organisations, which ran in 2009-2010
The Trustworthy Software Initiative (TSI—originally Software Security, Dependability and Resilience Initiative—SSDRI), a UK public good activity sponsored by CPNI between 2011 and 2016

Objectives
TSFdn primarily aims to provide a living backbone for signposting to diverse but often obscure sources of Good Practice, with a secondary objective to address other aspects of the 2009 Trustworthy Software Roadmap.

Trustworthiness

TSI considers that there are five facets of trustworthiness:

 Safety - The ability of the system to operate without harmful states
 Reliability - The ability of the system to deliver services as specified
 Availability - The ability of the system to deliver services when requested
 Resilience - The ability of the system to transform, renew, and recover in timely response to events
 Security - The ability of the system to remain protected against accidental or deliberate attacks

This definition of trustworthiness is an extension of a widely used definition of dependability, adding as a 5th Facet of Resilience based on the UK Government approach.

Governance and Operation
TSFdn operates as a not-for-profit Company Limited by Guarantee, jointly owned by the subscriber organisations – UK professional bodies.

It is based at the Cyber Security Centre of the University of Warwick, and is formally linked to a cross section of stakeholders through the Advisory Committee on Trustworthy Software (ACTS).

The Technical Lead remains Ian Bryant, the Technical Director of the predecessor TSI, and the Chair of the ACTS is Sir Edmund Burton KBE, who was the President of the predecessor TSI.

Activities
 Updating its Trustworthy Software Framework (TSFr), originally published as British Standards (BS) Publicly Available Specification (PAS) 754, into a British Standard (through BSI Project Committee ICT/00-/09, Chaired by Ian Bryant)
 Continuing to engage with partners for promulgation of Software Trustworthiness across Education, in particular through the IAP, BCS and the IET

References 

Information technology management
Information technology organisations based in the United Kingdom
Organisations based in the London Borough of Ealing
Software engineering organizations